Amancio Escapa Aparicio O.C.D. (30 March 1938 – 5 May 2017) was a Roman Catholic bishop.

Born in Spain, Escapa Aparicio was ordained to the priesthood in 1962. He served as titular bishop of Cenae and as auxiliary bishop of the Roman Catholic Archdiocese of Santo Domingo from 1996 until 2016.

Notes

1938 births
2017 deaths
20th-century Roman Catholic bishops in the Dominican Republic
Spanish emigrants to the Dominican Republic
Discalced Carmelite bishops
21st-century Roman Catholic bishops in the Dominican Republic
Roman Catholic bishops of Santo Domingo